The Kunduz Offensive was a military offensive by the Taliban towards Kunduz. The Taliban took many towns surrounding Kunduz but failed to capture the city.

References

Conflicts in 2017
Conflicts in 2018
Battles of the War in Afghanistan (2001–2021)
2017 in Afghanistan
History of Kunduz Province